is a Japanese racing driver. His older brother, Juichi, is a three-time Super GT champion.

Racing record

Complete Formula Nippon results 
(key) (Races in bold indicate pole position) (Races in italics indicate fastest lap)

References 

1975 births
Living people
People from Nara, Nara
Japanese racing drivers
Japanese Formula 3 Championship drivers
Formula Nippon drivers
Super GT drivers